Carpostalagma viridis is a moth of the  subfamily Arctiinae. It was described by Plötz in 1880. It is found in Cameroon, the Democratic Republic of Congo, Equatorial Guinea and Uganda.

References

Arctiini
Moths described in 1880
Moths of Africa